Abschlach! is a rock band from Hamburg, Germany, whose music mainly focuses on their hometown Hamburg and the local football club Hamburger SV. "Abschlach!" refers on the one hand to the tee off in football, on the other hand to the tee off (shake hands) with the fans.

Style 
The band plays punk rock with English influences and German lyrics. With the second album, metal riffs were added in addition to ska and reggae influences.

Topics 
Mainly treats Abschlach! topics such as football and everything that goes with it, but also socio-critical texts or songs about their hometown of Hamburg are part of the lyrics. They rarely address political issues. In the song Abgelehnt from the album Freunde they take a stand against any kind of extremism without positioning themselves in any direction.

Discography

Albums 

 Ne’ einfache Band (2003, WMP/NMD)
 Runter ans Ufer (2005, WMP NMD)
 Freunde (2008, WMP/NMD)
 Du wirst uns siegen seh’n! (2012, WMP/NMD)
 Meist kommt’s anders (2015, WMP/Soulfood)
 Geile Zeit (2018, WMP/Soulfood)
 HSV! (2019, WMP/Soulfood)

Singles 

 Mein Hamburg lieb ich sehr (2003; WMP/NMD)
 HSV Vereinshymne (2008; WMP/NMD, vom 1887-Shop, limitierte Auflage)
 Getrennt in den Farben (2013; WMP/Membran)
 Mein Hamburg lieb ich sehr (2016, WMP/Soulfood)
 HSV forever (2017 WMP/Soulfood)
 Oldschool HSV (2018 WMP/Believe)

Charts

Weekly charts

References

External links 

 Official website
 

German punk rock groups
German rock music groups
Musical groups established in 1994
Musical groups from Hamburg
1994 establishments in Germany